Maharashtra provides legal protection to its tiger population through six dedicated tiger reserves under the precincts of the National Tiger Conservation Authority. under the initiative Project Tiger. These reserves cumulatively cover an estimated area of 9,113km2 which is about 3% of the total state area.

Citing the presence of tigers in two wild-life sanctuaries, environmentalists had put forth a proposal to declare Umred Karhandla Wildlife Sanctuary and Tipeshwar Wildlife Sanctuary as tiger reserves. This would result in creation of a tiger corridor for migration of tigers between different reserves to encourage genetic dispersion. As of October 2016, this proposal has been rejected.

History
Tiger reserves came to be created under the former Prime Minister Indira Gandhi's flagship program Project Tiger. It envisioned to create a safe heaven for tigers to flourish and receive legal protection against poachers. Melghat is the among the first nine tiger reserves to be declared in 1973-74 with Gugamal National Park as its core zone along with adjoining Melghat Wildlife Sanctuary and deciduous rich forest zones. Subsequently, over the years, five additional reserves were created. Tadoba National Park, formed in 1955, is one of the oldest national parks. In 1993 its merge with Andhari Wildlife Sanctuary led to the creation of Tadobo Andhari Tiger Reserve.

Tiger census
As of 2015, among all the Indian states, Maharashtra has the fifth largest tiger population.
The tiger population in the state shows a consistent rise from 103 in 2006 to 169 in 2010. The recent census in 2015 shows a rise to 190 which is a 12% increase between 2010-15.In 4th tiger census of 2018 tiger population has raised to 312.

List of tiger reserves

The numbers of the tigers in each of the tiger reserves are not mentioned 
To find out about the same please visit the given below link
https://bigcatsindia.com/tiger-reserves-in-maharashtra/

References

 
Wildlife conservation in India
Wildlife sanctuaries in Maharashtra
Conservation-reliant species